Jacob van Mosscher (c. 1600 – c. 1660), was a Dutch Golden Age landscape painter.

Biography
According to the RKD he is often confused with Jacob van Musscher, a pupil of Karel van Mander and the grandfather of Michiel van Musscher. He was a landscape painter who worked in Haarlem during the years 1635-1645.

References

Jacob van Mosscher on Artnet

1600s births
1660s deaths
Dutch Golden Age painters
Dutch male painters
Dutch landscape painters
Artists from Haarlem